Phi Draconis (φ Dra / φ Draconis) is a fourth-magnitude variable star in the constellation Draco. It has the Flamsteed designation 43 Draconis. It is also a triple star system where the brightest component is a chemically peculiar Ap star.

The brightness of φ Draconis varies by about 0.04 of a magnitude every 1.7 days. This is due to very strong magnetic fields at the surface of the star, and it is classified as an α2 Canum Venaticorum variable.

φ Draconis is a multiple star system containing three stars. The inner pair form a single-lined spectroscopic binary in an eccentric 128-day orbit. The outermost star orbits the inner pair every 308 years. A fourth component, C, is also listed in multiple star catalogues, but is only a chance alignment with the triple system.

Phi Draconis Aa is a main-sequence Ap star with a spectral class of B8. The main abundance excess is silicon, although iron and chromium and also notably elevated.

In Chinese astronomy, φ Draconis is called 柱史 (Pinyin: Zhùshǐ), meaning Official of Royal Archives, because this star is marking itself and stand alone in Official of Royal Archives asterism, Purple Forbidden enclosure (see: Chinese constellations).

References

External links 
Jim Kaler's Stars, University of Illinois: PHI DRA (Phi Draconis)
An Atlas of the Universe: Multiple Star Orbits

Draco (constellation)
Ap stars
Draconis, Phi
Draconis, 43
170000
Zhùshǐ
柱史
089908
6920
Durchmusterung objects
Alpha2 Canum Venaticorum variables
B-type main-sequence stars
Binary stars